For Us is an album by bassist Mike Richmond and pianist Andy LaVerne recorded in 1978 and released on the Danish label, SteepleChase.

Track listing 
All compositions by Mike Richmond except where noted.
 "For Us" – 6:15
 "Peace and Happiness" – 3:42
 "Prism" (Andy LaVerne, Mike Richmond) – 4:12
 "Skies" – 7:45
 "Bolero" – 9:32
 "Reflections" (LaVerne) – 7:29
 "Air" – 6:10

Personnel 
Mike Richmond – bass
Andy LaVerne – piano

References 

 

Andy LaVerne albums
Mike Richmond (musician) albums
1978 albums
SteepleChase Records albums